"Zdravljica" (English: "A Toast") is a carmen figuratum poem by the 19th-century Romantic Slovene poet France Prešeren, inspired by the ideals of Liberté, égalité, fraternité. It was written in 1844 and published with some changes in 1848. Four years after it was written, Slovenes living within Habsburg Empire interpreted the poem in spirit of the 1848 March Revolution as political promotion of the idea of a united Slovenia. In it, the poet also declares his belief in a free-thinking Slovene and Slavic political awareness. In 1989, it was adopted as the anthem of Slovenia, becoming the national anthem upon independence in 1991.

History 

The integral version of the poem was first published only after the March Revolution when Austrian censorship was abolished, since the censorship did not allow for the poem to be printed earlier because of its political message. On 26 April 1848, it was published by the Slovene newspaper Kmetijske in rokodelske novice, that was edited by the Slovene conservative political leader Janez Bleiweis.

Before the censorship was abolished, Prešeren omitted the third stanza ("V sovražnike 'z oblakov / rodú naj naš'ga treši gróm") because he intended to include the poem in his Poezije collection (Poems), however the censor (fellow-Slovene Franz Miklosich in Austrian service) saw in the fourth stanza ("Edinost, sreča, sprava / k nam naj nazaj se vrnejo") an expression of pan-Slavic sentiment and therefore did not allow its publication either. Prešeren believed the poem would be mutilated without both the third and the fourth stanza and decided against including it in the Poezije.

"Zdravljica" was first set to music in the 1860s by Benjamin Ipavec and Davorin Jenko, but their versions didn't go well with the public, probably because the stanzas that they chose were not enough nationally awakening. In 1905, the Slovene composer Stanko Premrl wrote a choral composition. It became an immediate success.

Notes

References

External links

1844 poems
Poetry by France Prešeren
Anthems of Slovenia
European anthems
National anthem compositions in B-flat major